The Oath is a 1921 British silent drama film directed by Fred Paul and starring Margot Drake and Lewis Gilbert. Part of a Grand Guignol series of films, it focuses on a promise made by a Priest in the eighteenth century to protect his brother's family.

Cast
 Margot Drake - Lizette  
 Lewis Gilbert - The Priest

References

External links

1921 films
British silent short films
1921 drama films
1920s English-language films
Films directed by Fred Paul
British drama films
British black-and-white films
1920s British films
Silent drama films